Jack Benjamin Robert Keeping (born 19 September 1996) is an English former first-class cricketer.

Keeping was born at Northampton and was educated at Stowe School, before going up to Anglia Ruskin University. While studying at Anglia Ruskin, he made two appearances in first-class cricket for Cambridge MCCU against Essex in 2018 and Nottinghamshire in 2019. In addition to playing first-class cricket, Keeping also plays minor counties cricket for Bedfordshire, having made to date ten appearances in the Minor Counties Championship, four appearances in the MCCA Knockout Trophy and ten appearances in the Minor Counties T20.

References

External links

1996 births
Living people
Cricketers from Northampton
People educated at Stowe School
Alumni of Anglia Ruskin University
English cricketers
Bedfordshire cricketers
Cambridge MCCU cricketers